The fruit doves, also known as fruit pigeons, are a genus (Ptilinopus) of birds in the pigeon and dove family (Columbidae). These colourful, frugivorous doves are found in forests and woodlands in Southeast Asia and Oceania. It is a large genus with over 50 species, some threatened or already extinct.

Taxonomy
The genus Ptilinopus was introduced in 1825 by the English naturalist William John Swainson with the rose-crowned fruit dove (Ptilinopus regina) as the type species. The genus name combines the Ancient Greek  meaning "feather" with  meaning "foot".

The many species of this genus can be further grouped by geography and by certain shared characteristics.  The fruit doves of the Sunda Islands and northern Australia, such as the pink-headed fruit dove and banded fruit dove, have comparatively longer tails than other species, and are notable for their solid colouration on the head, neck and breast, with a black band across the belly.  Another grouping can be made of certain fruit doves endemic to New Guinea, the Moluccas, and the Bismarck Archipelago, including the carunculated fruit dove, knob-billed fruit dove, and others; these are notable for their grey colouration on the head or shoulder and/or enlarged cere (part of the bill).  This group is uncharacteristically not sexually dimorphic, meaning males and females look alike. The orange dove, golden dove, and whistling dove, all endemic to Fiji and sometimes placed in their own genus Chrysoena, have in common their small size, compact shape, yellow or orange colouration in the males, and hair-like body feathers.  They also are known for their rather un-pigeon-like vocalizations, which sound like snapping, barking, or whistling, respectively. Finally, the Pacific Islands provide homes to a number of species that share generally green colouration with crimson caps or crowns, ventriloquial cooing or hooting, and a distinct texture of the breast feathers. Recent evidence suggests Ptilinopus as presently defined is paraphyletic as Alectroenas and Drepanoptila are embedded within it.

Species

The genus contains 59 species:
 Banded fruit dove,  Ptilinopus cinctus
 Black-banded fruit dove,  Ptilinopus alligator – split from banded fruit dove
 Red-naped fruit dove,  Ptilinopus dohertyi
 Pink-headed fruit dove,  Ptilinopus porphyreus
 Flame-breasted fruit dove,  Ptilinopus marchei
 Cream-breasted fruit dove,  Ptilinopus merrilli
 Yellow-breasted fruit dove,  Ptilinopus occipitalis
 Red-eared fruit dove,  Ptilinopus fischeri
 Jambu fruit dove,  Ptilinopus jambu
 Banggai fruit dove,  Ptilinopus subgularis
 Oberholser's fruit dove,  Ptilinopus gularis – split from Banggai fruit dove
 Sula fruit dove,  Ptilinopus mangoliensis – split from Banggai fruit dove
 Black-chinned fruit dove,  Ptilinopus leclancheri
 Scarlet-breasted fruit dove,  Ptilinopus bernsteinii
 Wompoo fruit dove,  Ptilinopus magnificus
 Pink-spotted fruit dove,  Ptilinopus perlatus
 Ornate fruit dove,  Ptilinopus ornatus
 Eastern ornate fruit dove, tilinopus gestroi
 Samoan fruit dove, Ptilinopus fasciatus
 Tanna fruit dove,  Ptilinopus tannensis
 Orange-fronted fruit dove,  Ptilinopus aurantiifrons
 Wallace's fruit dove,  Ptilinopus wallacii
 Superb fruit dove,  Ptilinopus superbus
 Western superb fruit-dove, Ptilinopus temminckii
 Many-colored fruit dove,  Ptilinopus perousii
 Crimson-crowned fruit dove,  Ptilinopus porphyraceus
 Purple-capped fruit dove,  Ptilinopus ponapensis – split from crimson-crowned fruit dove
 Kosrae fruit dove,  Ptilinopus hernsheimi – split from crimson-crowned fruit dove
 Palau fruit dove,  Ptilinopus pelewensis
 Lilac-crowned fruit dove,  Ptilinopus rarotongensis
 Mariana fruit dove,  Ptilinopus roseicapilla

 Rose-crowned fruit dove,  Ptilinopus regina
 Silver-capped fruit dove,  Ptilinopus richardsii
Geelvink fruit dove, Ptilinopus speciosus – split from yellow-bibbed fruit dove
 Grey-green fruit dove,  Ptilinopus purpuratus
 Raiatea fruit-dove, Ptilinopus chrysogaster – split from grey-green fruit dove
 Makatea fruit dove,  Ptilinopus chalcurus
 Atoll fruit dove,  Ptilinopus coralensis
 Red-bellied fruit dove,  Ptilinopus greyi
 Rapa fruit dove,  Ptilinopus huttoni
 White-capped fruit dove,  Ptilinopus dupetithouarsii
 † Red-moustached fruit dove,  Ptilinopus mercierii - extinct (mid-20th century)
 Henderson fruit dove,  Ptilinopus insularis
 Coroneted fruit dove,  Ptilinopus coronulatus
 Beautiful fruit dove,  Ptilinopus pulchellus
 Blue-capped fruit dove,  Ptilinopus monacha
 White-bibbed fruit dove,  Ptilinopus rivoli
 Yellow-bibbed fruit dove,  Ptilinopus solomonensis
 Claret-breasted fruit dove,  Ptilinopus viridis
 White-headed fruit dove,  Ptilinopus eugeniae
 Lompobattang fruit-dove, Ptilinopus meridionalis

 Orange-bellied fruit dove,  Ptilinopus iozonus
 Knob-billed fruit dove,  Ptilinopus insolitus
 Grey-headed fruit dove,  Ptilinopus hyogastrus
 Carunculated fruit dove,  Ptilinopus granulifrons
 Black-naped fruit dove,  Ptilinopus melanospilus
 Dwarf fruit dove,  Ptilinopus nainus
 Negros fruit dove,  Ptilinopus arcanus – possibly extinct (late 20th century?)
 Orange fruit dove,  Ptilinopus victor
 Golden fruit dove,  Ptilinopus luteovirens
 Whistling fruit dove,  Ptilinopus layardi

Description
These small- to medium-sized doves generally have short, fan-shaped tails, and are remarkable for their colourful and often glossy plumage, as evidenced in the aptly named orange fruit dove, flame-breasted fruit dove, and pink-headed fruit dove. Males and females of many fruit dove species look very different.  For example, the female many-colored fruit dove shares the male's crimson crown and deep pink undertail feathers, but is otherwise green, whereas the male has a crimson on the upper back and has areas of yellow, olive, cinnamon, and grey.

Distribution and habitat
This is a large genus, most diverse in and around the island of New Guinea, in the Philippines, and in the biogeographical region of Wallacea.  Some species have ranges as far west as the Sunda Islands, others north to Taiwan, south to Australia, and east into Polynesia.

Behaviour and ecology

Fruit doves, as their name implies, eat fruit. Ficus is especially important. They live in various kinds of forest or woodland. Some species are restricted to primary forest, such as lowland rainforest, montane forest, or monsoon forest, while others prefer secondary forest or disturbed areas.  Some species specialize in particular habitats, from lowland coastal forest to the cloud forest or moss forest of high altitudes.  Some species of fruit doves are only found in habitats dominated by particular plants, such as mangrove, eucalyptus, or pandanus.  Only a few species can commonly be seen around human habitation, these include the knob-billed fruit dove, Makatea fruit dove, and black-naped fruit dove, which are known to visit gardens and such.

Much is still to be learned about fruit doves.  Many species are shy and difficult to observe in their natural habitat.  For example, there are several species in the Philippines, and for most of them, little or nothing is known of their breeding or nesting behavior.

References

 
Bird genera
Taxa named by William John Swainson